Iron Crown can refer to:

Iron Crown of Lombardy, part of the regalia of the Kingdom of Italy
Order of the Iron Crown (Kingdom of Italy), an order associated with the Iron Crown of Lombardy
Order of the Iron Crown (Austria), an order of merit of Austria and Austria-Hungary until 1918

Places
 Iron Crown Airport (FAA id: 22OR), Marion County, Oregon, USA

People
 King of the Lombards, from his crown, the Iron Crown

Entertainment
The Japanese Noh play "Kanawa" ("鉄輪" "The Iron Crown")
Iron Crown Enterprises, a roleplaying game publisher

Film
The Iron Crown 1941 film
Mythica: The Iron Crown (2016 film) U.S. fantasy film

Other uses
 , Australian iron ore carrier sunk in WWII

See also
 Iron Throne (disambiguation)
 Iron Lord (disambiguation)
 Iron Lady (disambiguation)